Maldives Cup Winners' Cup was a tournament that was played between champions of the 4 major tournaments of previous year Dhivehi League, Maldives FA Cup, President's Cup (Maldives), and POMIS Cup.

Previous winners
1995: Club Lagoons
1996: 
1997: not held
1998: 
1999: New Radiant SC 3-1 Victory Sports Club
2000: New Radiant SC
2001: Valencia 1-1 Huraa (aet, 5-4 pens)
2002: Victory Sports Club 4-3 Club Valencia
2003: New Radiant SC 1-1 Club Valencia (aet, 3-1 pens)
2004: Club Valencia 1-0 Island FC
2005: VB 2-1 Victory Sports Club
2006: Victory Sports Club 3-3 New Radiant SC (aet, 2-1 pens)
2007: Club Valencia 3-1 New Radiant SC
2008: New Radiant SC 1-0 Victory Sports Club

Number of winners
Club Valencia 
New Radiant SC 
Victory Sports Club

References

//http://www.rsssf.com/tablesm/maledcuphist.html
//http://www.famaldives.com/

Football cup competitions in the Maldives